Woodlan Junior-Senior High School is a public high school located in unincorporated Allen County, Indiana, near Woodburn, a city close to Fort Wayne. It is a part of East Allen County Schools (EACS).

In addition to Woodburn, Harlan, and a small section of New Haven are within the school's attendance zone.

History

Woodlan was built cooperatively between the Milan Township and Maumee Township school districts for the 1959-1960 school year.  The name Woodlan was a combination of Maumee township where Woodburn (Wood) is located and Milan township (lan) to create the name Woodlan. Harlan High School consolidated into Woodlan in 1965.

See also
 List of high schools in Indiana
 Allen County Athletic Conference
 East Allen County Schools
 Woodburn, Indiana

References

External links 
 Official Website

Public high schools in Indiana
Schools in Allen County, Indiana
1959 establishments in Indiana